Jean Morax (16 September 1869 – 11 May 1939) was a painter, theater decorator and draftsman from the Canton of Vaud.

Biography 
A pupil of Édouard Castres in Geneva then of Benjamin Constant, of Luc-Olivier Merson and Jean-Paul Laurens in Paris, Jean Morax shared his life between Paris, Florence and Switzerland. He exhibited his paintings influenced by the Nabis in Geneva, notably at the National Exhibition (1896), in Paris (bronze medal at the Exposition Universelle (1900)) and in Munich (1905).

With his brother René, he created the Théâtre du Jorat in Mézières in 1903; There, he designed costumes, sets and posters, especially for Henriette (1908), Tell (1914), Le Roi David (1921), and La belle de Moudon. (1931).

He created the costumes of the 1905 Fête des vignerons in Vevey.

Sources 
 Jean Morax (1869-1939) on Bibliothèque cantonale et universitaire de Lausanne
 
 Notabilités vaudoises 1933, p. 67
 Marcus Osterwalder Dictionnaire des illustrateurs.
 Patrie suisse, 1917, No 610 p. 26-27
 Patrie suisse, 1903, No 252, p. 119-121
 photo Thibault, Morges Patrie suisse, (E. de B.) 1902, No 216, p. 5-8
 DBAS, 742
 Yvan Schwab, René Morax, un théâtre pour le peuple, 2003
 DTS, 1272-1273

References

External links 
 Photo - Jean Morax on notrehistoire.ch
 Historique, Le Théâtre du Jorat
 Short biography
 Voilier sur le Léman (painting) 
 Jean Morax, Eleanor of Aquitaine, Swiss Theater Poster on 1stdibs

20th-century Swiss painters
Swiss male painters
1869 births
People from Morges
1939 deaths
20th-century Swiss male artists